Petra Cicvarić (born 29 March 1986) is a Croatian actress.

Filmography

Television roles

References

External links

1986 births
Living people
Croatian stage actresses
Croatian television actresses
People from Osijek
21st-century Croatian actresses